Jason Butler Rote is an American television writer, known mainly for his work at Hanna-Barbera on Cartoon Network animated television series like Dexter's Laboratory (1996-2003) and The Powerpuff Girls (1998–2005). He attended McClintock High School.

Filmography

Other work
In 1995 Rote, along with Mark Hughes and Joe LoCicero, published The Jetsons Character Reference Guide under the Hanna-Barbera label.

Awards and nominations
He and fellow writer Paul Rudish won an Annie Award in 1997 in the category "Best Individual Achievement: Writing in a TV Production" for their work on the Dexter's Laboratory episode "Beard to Be Feared". He was also nominated for three Primetime Emmys: in 1997 and 1998 for Dexter's Laboratory and in 1999 for The Powerpuff Girls.

References

External links
 

American male screenwriters
Living people
American male television writers
American television writers
Year of birth missing (living people)
Annie Award winners
Cartoon Network Studios people